Melaleuca megalongensis, commonly known as Megalong Valley bottlebrush, is a plant in the myrtle family, Myrtaceae and is endemic to New South Wales. (Some Australian state herbaria use the name Callistemon megalongensis). It is a shrub similar to Melaleuca citrina (Callistemon citrinus) which occurs in the same area and is difficult to distinguish from it, except when in flower.

Description
There is a mid-vein and 15 to 24 lateral veins. The leaves usually have some thickening at the mid-vein and margins.

The filaments of the stamens are pink with a dark red anther.

Taxonomy and naming
Melaleuca megalongensis was first formally described in 2009 by Lyndley Craven in Novon. The specific epithet (megalongensis) refers to the locality where the species is found.

Callistemon megalongensis is regarded as a synonym of Melaleuca megalongensis by the Royal Botanic Gardens, Kew,

Distribution and habitat
This melaleuca occurs in the Megalong Valley in the Blue Mountains. It grows in damp situations near streams.

Conservation
Melaleuca megalongensis has been classified as "critically endangered" (as Callistemon megalongensis) under the Australian Government Environment Protection and Biodiversity Conservation Act 1999 and by the Scientific Committee of the NSW Government Department of Environment and Heritage.

References

megalongensis
Flora of New South Wales
Plants described in 2009
Taxa named by Lyndley Craven